The Massacre of Ayyadieh occurred during the Third Crusade after the fall of Acre when King Richard I had more than two thousand Muslim prisoners of war from the captured city beheaded in front of the Ayyubid armies of sultan Saladin on 20 August 1191. Despite attacks by Muslim forces during the killings, the Christian Crusaders were able to retire in good order. Saladin subsequently ordered various Crusader prisoners of war to be executed in retaliation.

Contemporary sources 
The most important sources written during or shortly after the events are:
 The al-Nawādir al-Sultaniyya wa'l-Maḥāsin al-Yūsufiyya ("Sultany Anecdotes and Josephly Virtues", in 2001 translated by D. S. Richards as The Rare and Excellent History of Saladin), an Arabic biography of Saladin written by the Kurdish chronicler Baha ad-Din ibn Shaddad who served in Saladin's camp and was an eyewitness
 The Itinerarium Peregrinorum et Gesta Regis Ricardi ("Account of the Crusade and the Deeds of King Richard"), a Latin book written in the early 1220s by the English canon Richard de Templo, who may or may not have participated in the Third Crusade himself
 The Crusade and Death of Richard I, a mid-13th-century Anglo-Norman anonymous chronicle based on the earlier writings of Roger of Howden, Roger of Wendover and Matthew Paris. (The original text had no title; the title 'The Crusade and Death of Richard I' was assigned to it by British historian Ronald Carlyle Johnston in 1961 when he translated it to modern English)
 Sébastien Mamerot mentions the massacre briefly at the beginning of Chapter LXVI of his chronicle of the crusades, Passages d'outremer, with the number of deaths being estimated at 5000 souls. There is no mention of non-combatants.

Massacre 
After the fall of Acre, Richard I wanted to exchange a large number of Muslim prisoners from the city for the True Cross, 100,000 gold pieces and 1600 Christians held captive by Saladin. A deal was struck and a deadline set for Saladin to fulfill his part of the deal. 

Distrust between the two leaders developed and a breakdown of negotiations ensued, each side demanding that their opponent's hostages be released first. After the agreed time limit for the Saracens to hand over the cross had expired, Richard, increasingly under the impression that Saladin was stalling, decided to have his hostages publicly executed. On 16 August Richard ordered that all the prisoners from Acre should be taken to a small hill called Ayyadieh. He ordered 2700 Turkish hostages to be led bound out of the city to be beheaded.

The massacre was controversial for contemporary Christian sources. The Itinerarium Peregrinorum estimated that 2700 Turkish hostages were killed, but do not mention any non-combatants that were present. Christian sources at the time take care to mention the strategic burden of the hostages as well as the transgressions of Saladin before the massacre was ordered. Baha ad-Din indicates that even many of the crusaders disapproved of Richard's actions and couldn't understand why Richard ordered the executions.

Parts of the Ayyubid army became so enraged by the killings that they attempted to charge the Crusader lines but were repeatedly beaten back, allowing Richard I and his forces to retire in good order.

Counter-massacre 
Any hope of regaining the True Cross disappeared after Ayyadieh; it was rumored that Saladin sent it to Damascus. By his orders the 1600 Christian prisoners were executed in Damascus. According to American historian John J. Robinson (1992): 'As news of the slaughter spread throughout Saladin's empire, Christian prisoners everywhere were tortured and murdered in reprisal for their infamy.' In A History of the Crusades. Volume III (1954), English historian Steven Runciman noted that between 22 and 30 August, as Richard's army marched from Acre past Haifa to Jaffa, Saracen light horsemen carried out various assaults on the crusaders and took several prisoners 'who were taken to Saladin, cross-questioned and then slain, in vengeance for the massacre at Acre. Only the washerwomen were spared.'

Studying Saladin's overall attitude towards prisoners of war, Gervers & Powell (2001) stated that, 'in spite of his reputation for magnanimity, Saladin's treatment of prisoners of war was quite callous.' They noted that Saladin was generous towards conquered populations and captured crusader commanders as long as he was achieving victories, but when he did not, or even suffered defeats, 'Saladin's behavior toward prisoners was savage, and they were quite systematically put to death.' Although scholars of Islamic law justified execution of prisoners under certain conditions, contemporary Islamic historians were divided on the moral acceptability of Saladin's killing of captives. During earlier campaigns in 1177–1179, Saladin had various captured Crusader soldiers and Christian civilians executed at different instances. When he conquered Jerusalem in 1187, however, Saladin released most Christian prisoners for ransoms. After the 1191 loss of Acre and Ayyadieh massacre, Saladin was again frustrated by his military setbacks and also desired vengeance, leading to another spike in prisoner executions.

Notes

References

Bibliography 
 

Battles of the Third Crusade
Massacres in Asia
Crusades
Conflicts in 1191
Persecution of Muslims by Christians
Richard I of England
1191 in Asia
Saladin
Massacres of Muslims